Robert Hastie Stenhouse (1924–1990) was an England international lawn and indoor bowls competitor.

Bowls career
He captained England at the 1966 World Outdoor Bowls Championship where he won a bronze medal in the team event (Leonard Trophy) and four years later represented England at the 1970 Commonwealth Games in the fours event.

He won the 1963 fours title at the England Men's National Championships when bowling for Wellingborough Town BC.

During the 1972 World Outdoor Bowls Championship, he was the England team manager and was also an indoor international from 1968-1972.

Personal life
He took up bowls with his father in 1947 and was married in 1953.

References

1924 births
1990 deaths
English male bowls players
Bowls players at the 1970 British Commonwealth Games
Commonwealth Games competitors for England